Daniel Onjeh is  a Nigerian politician, activist, the former president of the West African Students' Union and the  National Association of Nigerian Students and currently the Chairman Governing Board of Project Development Institute (PRODA).

Background and education 
Onjeh was born on December 13, 1973 and is a native of Orokam, Ogbadibo the Local Government  Area of Benue State.

He was Elected the President of the National Association of Nigerian students in 2002, and subsequently the President of West African Students' Union in 2006.

He holds a bachelor's degree in political science and economics from the prestigious University of Ghana, Legon.

Political career 
Daniel Onjeh's passion for his people motivated him to contest election in 2015 to the Senate  to represent the people of Benue South Senatorial District under the platform of All Progressives Congress which he lost to the then Senate President Senator David Mark in a keenly contested election.

In 2017, he was appointed the Board Chairman of Project Development Institute (PRODA) by the President Muhammadu Buhari.

Personal life 
He is married and has children.

Awards and honours 
Daniel Onjeh has several awards including 

 Ogbenjuwa KI'doma (2002)
 Most Outstanding Youth Leader's Awards (2003)
 Defender of Democracy Award (2006)
 Icon of Benue Youths (2008)

References

Living people
Year of birth missing (living people)